Paula is a three-part British-Irish television drama series, created by screenwriter Conor McPherson, that was first broadcast on RTÉ One on 24 May 2017 in Ireland and BBC Two on 25 May 2017 in the UK. The series focuses on schoolteacher Paula Denny (Denise Gough), who after a chance encounter with handyman James Moorcroft (Tom Hughes), finds her life turned upside down and the safety of everyone she cares about in danger. Filmed in Dublin and Belfast and produced by Cuba Pictures, the series immediately drew comparisons from viewers and critics alike with fellow Northern Irish thriller The Fall. The series was commissioned in September 2016 by former controller of BBC drama, Polly Hill.

Alongside Gough and Hughes, the series also stars Owen McDonnell as police officer Mac, and Edward MacLiam as Paula's love interest, fellow teacher Philip Byrden. The series was directed by Alex Holmes and produced by Peter Norris, known for his work on former BBC2 stablemate Line of Duty. Gough said of her character: "This woman is acting out in this way that so many of us do and not apologising for it. Also I love the connection to her family. She has a weird lack of intimacy with her family and that informed why she chose unavailable men. What is also interesting is people say ‘she is not very likeable’ and that is such a funny thing we say about women in this position."

The series was released on DVD on 12 June 2017.

Cast
 Denise Gough as Paula Denny
 Tom Hughes as James Moorcroft
 Owen McDonnell as DI "Mac" McArthur
 Edward MacLiam as Philip Byrden
 Sean McGinley as Terry
 Jane Brennan as Gemma
 Siobhán Cullen as Morgan
 Aoibhinn McGinnity as Crystal
 Emily Taaffe as Ruth Laurence
 Jonny Holden as Callum Denny
 Amelie Metcalfe as Mary
 Ciarán McMenamin as Ch. Supt. McGlynn
 David Herlihy as Hogan
 Aislín McGuckin as Diane

Episodes

References

External links
 

2017 British television series debuts
2017 British television series endings
2010s British crime television series
2010s British drama television series
Adultery in television
BBC television dramas
British crime drama television series
2010s British television miniseries
English-language television shows
Television series about dysfunctional families
Television shows set in the Republic of Ireland
Television series about educators